The Color of Silence is the fifth studio album by American singer Tiffany, released on November 7, 2000.  It represented a "comeback" for Tiffany, being her first studio album released in seven years, and the first released in the United States in ten years.  It was released after Tiffany returned to southern California after living in Nashville, Tennessee for several years attempting to develop her career as a songwriter, as well as to make a return as a country music artist.

Background
Originally, The Color of Silence was going to be released by Modern Records, but when this company ran into business troubles the release was switched to Eureka Records.

The Color of Silence is Tiffany's "alternative" album. It experimented with different facets of the genre including darker textures and lyrics, distorted guitars in "Butterfly" and the unusual  time signature in "Flown".

The ballad "If Only" is in memory of Tiffany's bodyguard, Frank D'Amato, who died of cancer at age 34 not long before the album was released.

An online download version, and a version released in non-US countries, each had bonus tracks not found on the original US CD release.

The song "Open My Eyes" was used in the film BearCity.

Critical reception and commercial performance
The Color of Silence received some very favorable reviews. A Billboard front-page article called it "thoughtful, intelligent, and full of grace", and said that it could be considered "Tiffany's equivalent to Alanis Morissette's landmark Jagged Little Pill."  However, the album did not achieve commercial success to match the critical welcome.  It made it onto the shelves of many record stores, but was not heavily promoted; it ended up selling mostly to the established fan base which had stuck with Tiffany over the years, as well as to a few new fans attracted by word of mouth or dance club play of songs from this album.

Track listing
 "Open My Eyes" (Joe Brooks, Tim Feehan) – 4:32
 "I'm Not Sleeping" (Tiffany, Joe Brooks, Tim Feehan, Anthony Henderson) (featuring Krayzie Bone) – 3:39
 "Piss U Off" (Tiffany, Tim Feehan, Joe Brooks) – 3:48
 "I Will Not Breakdown" (Tim Feehan, Joe Brooks, Gene Black) – 4:12
 "Keep Walking" (Cary Devore, Scott Shiflett) – 3:37
 "If Only" (Tiffany, Joe Brooks) – 4:13
 "Silence" (Tiffany, Tim Feehan, Gene Black) – 4:15
 "All The Talking" (Tiffany, Joe Brooks, Tim Feehan) – 3:55
 "Good Enough For Me" (Tiffany, Tim Feehan, Joe Brooks, Gene Black) – 4:12
 "Christening" (Ovis) – 4:17
 "Betty" (Joe Brooks) – 4:29
 "Cinnamon" (Tiffany, Joe Brooks, Tim Feehan) – 4:42
 "Butterfly" (Joe Brooks, Tim Feehan) – 3:43

Bonus tracks on non-US release 
 "As I Am" (Tiffany) – 2:36
 "Falling" (Tiffany, Tim Feehan) – 3:57
 "Flown" (Tiffany, Tim Feehan) – 4:30

Bonus tracks on download version 
 "Sometimes" (Tiffany, Tim Feehan) – 4:41
 "As I Am"

Personnel 
 Tiffany – lead vocals, backing vocals (1, 3, 7, 10, 12, 13)
 Tim Feehan – keyboards (1, 2, 4, 7, 8, 13, 15), electric bass (1-4, 7, 8, 9, 11, 12, 13, 15), drum programming (1-4, 7, 8, 9, 11, 12, 13, 15), backing vocals (1, 4, 7, 8, 9, 13, 14), synthesizers (3, 6, 9, 11), accordion (3), bagpipes (3), guitars (9), all instruments (16)
 Cary Devore – acoustic piano (5)
 Joe Brooks – guitars (1, 2, 3, 6, 8, 9, 11, 12, 13), backing vocals (1, 2, 4, 8, 12, 13), synthesizers (2, 6, 11), Wurlitzer electric piano (3, 8), additional synthesizers (3, 9), harmonica (3, 8), acoustic piano (6, 11), keyboards (12)
 David Frederic – additional electric guitars (1), guitars (4)
 Gene Black – guitars (4, 7, 9, 15), electric sitar (7)
 John Thomas – guitars (5)
 Cisco De Luna – additional guitars (10)
 Romeo Antonio – guitars (12)
 Brent Hoffert – electric guitars (14)
 Mark Dutton – bass (5)
 Clark Souter – bass (14)
 Herman Matthews – drums (2, 4, 7, 12)
 Mark Wickliffe – drums (5)
 Michael Fisher – percussion (2, 6, 9, 11), kalimba (2), vibraphone (9), tambora (9)
 David "Ovis" Means – percussion (5), backing vocals (5, 7), additional synthesizers (8), all instruments (10), keyboards (14), drums (14)
 Krayzie Bone – rap (2)
 Doug Elkins – backing vocals (7)
 Ked – backing vocals (8)
 London Jones – backing vocals (9, 11, 15, 16)

Production 
 Tiffany – production supervisor, exclusive management 
 Tim Feehan – producer (1-4, 7, 8, 9, 11, 12, 13, 15, 16), mixing (1, 2, 3, 6-9, 11, 12, 13, 15, 16)
 David "Ovis" Means – producer (5, 14), mixing (5, 10, 14), recording (10, 14), Pro Tools mix engineer (10)
 Joe Brooks – producer (6, 11)
 Jerry Christie – recording (1-4, 6-9, 11, 12, 13, 15, 16), Pro Tools mix engineer (12)
 Paul Wagner – recording (5, 10, 14)
 David Frederic – Pro Tools mix engineer (1-9, 11, 13), recording (5), mixing (5)
 Robert Biles – mixing (1-4, 6-9, 11, 12, 13, 15, 16)
 Glenn Sweitzer – art direction, design 
 Ron Davis – photography, exclusive management 
 Brad Schmidt – exclusive management 
 Calvin Haugen – stylist 
 Lynn Rodgers – hair, make-up 
 Bulmaro Garcia – hair, make-up (center spread)

References

2000 albums
Tiffany Darwish albums